Erigeron elegantulus is a North American species of flowering plants in the family Asteraceae known by the common names blue dwarf fleabane and volcanic daisy.

Erigeron elegantulus is an uncommon plant native to the Modoc Plateau and nearby areas in northeastern California and in eastern and southern Oregon.

Erigeron elegantulus grows on the rocky volcanic soils of the region. It is a small perennial herb forming patches of narrow, hard, pointed leaves a few centimeters long in shades of green to white. The erect stems are up to 15 centimeters (8 inches) in height and each hold a single flower head less than a centimeter (0.4 inches) wide. The head has a center of yellow disc florets and a fringe of 20-25 ray florets which may be blue, purple, or pink.

References

External links
Jepson Manual Treatment
United States Department of Agriculture Plants Profile
Calphotos Photo gallery, University of California

elegantulus
Flora of California
Flora of Oregon
Flora of the Great Basin
~
Endemic flora of the United States
Plants described in 1895
Flora without expected TNC conservation status